Free is the second album by R&B group For Real, released on September 17, 1996 (see 1996 in music).

Track listing
"Intro" – 0:55
"Like I Do" (Holland) – 4:06
"Good Morning Sunshine" – 4:13
"Hold Me" – 3:56
"So in Love" – 4:20
"Remember" – 4:23
"Will You Love Me" – 4:20
"The Saddest Song I Ever Heard" – 4:39
"Nothing Without You" – 4:45
"How Can I Get Close to You" – 4:08
"Love Will Be Waiting at Home" (From "Waiting to Exhale") (Babyface) – 5:16
"For All of My Life" (Reggie Hamilton) – 3:56
"Free" – 5:09

Personnel
Alex Alessandroni – piano
Craig B. – bass guitar, guitar
Babyface – synthesizer, keyboard
Curt Bisquera – percussion
Necia Bray
Stephen Bray – percussion
Paulinho Da Costa – percussion
Henry Ferber – violin
Ronnie Garrett – bass guitar
Reggie Hamilton – bass guitar
Ruth Johnson – violin
Suzie Katayama – cello
Abe Laboriel Jr. – percussion
Tomi Martin – guitar
Bill Meyers – conductor
Karie Prescott – viola
James Raymond – keyboard
Daryl Simmons – keyboard
Vance Taylor – piano
Michael Thompson – bass guitar
Trevor Veitch – guitar
Wendi Williams

Production
Producer: Dallas Austin, Craig B., Babyface, Curt Bisquera, Stephen Bray, Tony Sheppard, Soulshock, Mario Winans
Executive producer: Dallas Austin
Engineers: Leslie Brathwaite, Brad Gilderman, Manny Marraquin, Tony Sheppard, Brian Smith
Assistant engineers: Ricco Lumpkins, Carlton Lynn, Paul Thompson
Mixing: Leslie Brathwaite, Jon Gass, Karlin, Manny Marraquin, Neil Pogue, Tony Sheppard, Brian Smith, Soulshock, Mario Winans
Mastering: Herb Powers
Programming: Rick Sheppard, Daryl Simmons
Project coordinator: Kim Lumpkin
Design: Anthony Harrison, Jr., Sandy Lawrence
Photography: R.J. Muna, Arnold Turner

Charts
Album – Billboard (North America)

For Real albums
1996 albums
Albums produced by Dallas Austin